Tour Sueño Electro II was a tour of concerts electropop group Belanova, in support of its fifth studio album, Sueño Electro II (2012), the tour was officially announced on April 3, 2012 in the official YouTube account group, the tour began on April 12 in San Diego 2012 and he ended on May 26, 2012, in El Paso, Neon Desert Music SQ PK Cleveland ending with a total of eleven shows in the span of two months. This tour was only in USA, Belanova added two more dates for what is the closure of Electro Dream were presented on November 14 in the Ruby's Cafe in California with Moderatto and Moenia.

Set List 
Tour Sueño Electro II 

"Mariposas"
"Cada Que..."
"Chica Robot"
"Hasta El Final"
"Tus Ojos"
"Nada de Más"
"Toma Mi Mano"
"Paso El Tiempo"
"Escena Final"
"Bye Bye"
"Aun Asi Te Vas"
"Me Pregunto"
"Tic - Toc"
"Baila Mi Corazón"
"No Me Voy a Morir"
"Niño"
"One, Two, Three, Go!"
"Rosa Pastel"
"Por Ti"

Critical response 
Belanova announced via his official Twitter and YouTube channel initially eleven abrian dates for the tour but thanks to the success opened three more, Belanova added two more dates for what is the closure of Sueño Electro Tour were presented on November 14 in the Ruby's Cafe in California with Moderatto and Moenia

Shows

References

2012 concert tours